Paremhat 27 - Coptic Calendar - Paremhat 29

The twenty-eighth day of the Coptic month of Paremhat, the seventh month of the Coptic year. In common years, this day corresponds to March 24, of the Julian Calendar, and April 6, of the Gregorian Calendar. This day falls in the Coptic Season of Shemu, the season of the Harvest.

Commemorations

Saints 

 The departure of Emperor Constantine the Great
 The departure of Pope Peter VII, the 109th Patriarch of the See of Saint Mark 
 The departure of Saint Sarabamon Abu Tarha, Bishop of Menufia

References 

Days of the Coptic calendar